Vasilios Galanis (born 17 August 1987) is a Greek footballer who plays for Olympiakos Volou 1937 F.C. in the Football League as a forward.

References

1987 births
Living people
Greek footballers
Greek expatriate footballers
Association football forwards
Expatriate footballers in Romania
Liga I players
Apollon Pontou FC players
CS Gaz Metan Mediaș players
FC UTA Arad players